Canton is a town in Blaine County, Oklahoma, United States. The population was 625 at the 2010 census.

Geography
Canton is located at  (36.055563, -98.588991).

Demographics

As of the census of 2000, there were 618 people, 268 households, and 165 families residing in the town. The racial makeup of the town was 83.66% White, 10.68% Native American, 3.40% from other races, and 2.27% from two or more races. Hispanic or Latino of any race were 4.53% of the population.

There were 268 households, out of which 31.0% had children under the age of 18 living with them, 51.1% were married couples living together, 7.8% had a female householder with no husband present, and 38.1% were non-families. 36.9% of all households were made up of individuals, and 22.4% had someone living alone who was 65 years of age or older. The average household size was 2.31 and the average family size was 3.02.

In the town, the population was spread out, with 26.9% under the age of 18, 8.1% from 18 to 24, 19.6% from 25 to 44, 26.1% from 45 to 64, and 19.4% who were 65 years of age or older. The median age was 41 years. For every 100 females, there were 85.0 males. For every 100 females age 18 and over, there were 82.3 males.

The median income for a household in the town was $23,250, and the median income for a family was $35,750. Males had a median income of $31,250 versus $20,179 for females. The per capita income for the town was $18,591. About 11.4% of families and 16.3% of the population were below the poverty line, including 28.0% of those under age 18 and 17.2% of those age 65 or over.

References

External links
 Encyclopedia of Oklahoma History and Culture - Canton
 Video from KOCO shows what appears to be a tornado touching the ground in Canton, Oklahoma, 2 March 2008.

Towns in Blaine County, Oklahoma
Towns in Oklahoma